Sofronije Podgoričanin (Podgorica, Ottoman Empire, today's Montenegro, 1668 – Sremski Karlovci, Habsburg Empire, today's Serbia, 7 January 1711) was the Metropolitan of Krušedol (near Sremski Karlovci), from 1710 to 1711, and one of the most important metropolitans of the Serbian Orthodox Church of the time. Sofronije succeeded metropolitan Isaija Đaković, who died in 1708.

Sofronije Podgoričanin was born in Podgorica in what is now Montenegro but was then part of the Ottoman Empire. He joined the monastic order as a youngster at a monastery and later, after completing his theological studies in Peć, was elevated through the ranks. Sofronije became an archimandrite at the Patriarchate of Peć and when Bishop Jovan of Papraća Monastery died in 1694, he was named the monastery's administrator and exarch of Patriarch Arsenije III Čarnojević. With the patriarch, he migrated north to the Serbian territories, then under Austrian and Hungarian rule.

After bishop Petronije Ljubibratić died and his brother Janićije (Ljubibratić) succeeded him in the Eparchy of Slavonia, it was Sofronije Podgoričanin who was named successor by Arsenije III.

In 1703 the Hungarians, under the leadership of their famous Transylvanian Prince Francis II Rákóczi, rebelled against the Austrians, demanding Hungarian independence from the Habsburg monarchy. It was only then that Vienna eased the pressure on the Serbs, hoping to pacify them because of Austria's need for assistance in dealings with Hungarians. In this political game of chess between Vienna and the Serbs, no opportunities were missed by Patriarch Arsenije III to replace the Uniate Bishop of Pakrac with Bishop Sofronije Podgoričanin, in 1705. The following year, Patriarch Arsenije III sent the Austrian Emperor a written request that the Serbian Orthodox church, political, economic and military rights be spared further restrictions. And so, in 1706, Emperor Joseph I (1705-1711) reconfirmed the privileges granted Serbs by Leopold I.

The second Krušedol sabor of 1710 in order to elect a replacement for Isaija Đaković who died in 1708. The newly elected Metropolitan Sofronije Podgoričanin was prevented by the Austrians from giving his oath of allegiance to the Peć Patriarch. However, Patriarch Kalinik I (1691-1710) gave his blessings as well as an official scroll confirming the Metropolitan of Krušedol, and at the same time, extended to him and his See, a form of autonomy. Despite Vienna's constant meddling in Serb affairs, the Serb Orthodox were slowly entrenching their communal organizations and settling themselves permanently. The early death of Metropolitan Sofronije prompted another calling of a third assembly (sabor) in April 1713, in Sremski Karlovci. For two years again, the Church was leaderless until Vikentije Popović-Hadžilavić (1713-1725) was elected.

Sofronije Podgoričanin is remembered as a defender of Serbian interests in the Pakrac region during the reign of Joseph I.

See also
 Metropolitanate of Karlovci

References

Sources

 
 

1668 births
1711 deaths
People from Podgorica
Metropolitans of Karlovci